This is a list of the mammal species recorded in Morocco.

The following tags are used to highlight each species' conservation status as assessed by the International Union for Conservation of Nature:

Order: Macroscelidea (elephant shrews) 

Often called sengis, the elephant shrews or jumping shrews are native to Africa. Their common English name derives from their elongated flexible snout, which is vaguely similar to the trunk of an elephant (to whom they are distantly related) and their resemblance to the true shrews.

Family: Macroscelididae (elephant shrews)
Genus: Elephantulus
 North African elephant shrew, E. rozeti

Order: Hyracoidea (hyraxes)

The hyraxes are any of four species of fairly small, thickset, herbivorous mammals in the order Hyracoidea. About the size of a domestic cat they are well furred, with rounded bodies and a stumpy tail. They are native to Africa and the Middle East.

Family: Procaviidae (hyraxes)
Genus: Procavia
 Cape hyrax, P. capensis

Order: Primates 

The order Primates contains humans and their closest relatives: lemurs, lorisoids, tarsiers, monkeys, and apes.
Suborder: Haplorhini
Infraorder: Simiiformes
Parvorder: Catarrhini
Superfamily: Cercopithecoidea
Family: Cercopithecidae (Old World monkeys)
Subfamily: Cercopithecinae
Genus: Macaca
 Barbary macaque, M. sylvanus

Order: Rodentia (rodents) 

Rodents make up the largest order of mammals, with over 40% of mammalian species. They have two incisors in the upper and lower jaw which grow continually and must be kept short by gnawing.
Suborder: Hystricognathi
Family: Hystricidae (Old World porcupines)
Subfamily: Hystricinae
Genus: Hystrix
Crested porcupine, H. cristata 
Suborder: Sciurognathi
Family: Sciuridae (squirrels)
Subfamily: Xerinae
Tribe: Xerini
Genus: Atlantoxerus
 Barbary ground squirrel, Atlantoxerus getulus 
Genus: Xerus
 Striped ground squirrel, Xerus erythropus 
Family: Dipodidae (jerboas)
Subfamily: Dipodinae
Genus: Jaculus
 Lesser Egyptian jerboa, Jaculus jaculus 
 Greater Egyptian jerboa, Jaculus orientalis 
Family: Gliridae (dormice)
Subfamily: Leithiinae
Genus: Eliomys
 Maghreb garden dormouse, Eliomys munbyanus 
Family: Muridae (mice, rats, gerbils)
Subfamily: Deomyinae
Genus: Acomys
 Cairo spiny mouse, Acomys cahirinus 
 Chudeau's spiny mouse, Acomys chudeaui 
Subfamily: Gerbillinae
Genus: Dipodillus
 North African gerbil, Dipodillus campestris 
Genus: Gerbillus
 Lesser Egyptian gerbil, Gerbillus gerbillus 
 Pygmy gerbil, Gerbillus henleyi 
 Western gerbil, Gerbillus hesperinus 
 Hoogstraal's gerbil, Gerbillus hoogstraali 
 Greater short-tailed gerbil, Gerbillus maghrebi 
 Balochistan gerbil, Gerbillus nanus 
 Occidental gerbil, Gerbillus occiduus 
 Lesser short-tailed gerbil, Gerbillus simoni 
 Tarabul's gerbil, Gerbillus tarabuli 
Genus: Meriones
 Sundevall's jird, Meriones crassus 
 Moroccan jird, Meriones grandis 
 Libyan jird, Meriones libycus 
 Shaw's jird, Meriones shawi 
Genus: Pachyuromys
 Fat-tailed gerbil, Pachyuromys duprasi 
Genus: Psammomys
 Fat sand rat, Psammomys obesus 
Subfamily: Murinae
Genus: Apodemus
 Wood mouse, Apodemus sylvaticus 
Genus: Lemniscomys
 Barbary striped grass mouse, Lemniscomys barbarus 
Genus: Mastomys
 Guinea multimammate mouse, Mastomys erythroleucus 
Genus: Mus
House mouse, M. musculus 
 Algerian mouse, M. spretus 
Genus: Rattus
 Black rat, R. rattus  introduced
 Brown rat, Rattus norvegicus  introduced
Family: Ctenodactylidae
Genus: Ctenodactylus
 Common gundi, Ctenodactylus gundi 
 Val's gundi, Ctenodactylus vali

Order: Lagomorpha (lagomorphs) 

The lagomorphs comprise two families, Leporidae (hares and rabbits), and Ochotonidae (pikas). Though they can resemble rodents, and were classified as a superfamily in that order until the early 20th century, they have since been considered a separate order. They differ from rodents in a number of physical characteristics, such as having four incisors in the upper jaw rather than two.

Family: Leporidae (rabbits, hares)
Genus: Lepus
 Cape hare, L. capensis 
 African savanna hare, L. victoriae 
Genus: Oryctolagus
 European rabbit, O. cuniculus

Order: Erinaceomorpha (hedgehogs and gymnures) 

The order Erinaceomorpha contains a single family, Erinaceidae, which comprise the hedgehogs and gymnures. The hedgehogs are easily recognised by their spines while gymnures look more like large rats.

Family: Erinaceidae (hedgehogs)
Subfamily: Erinaceinae
Genus: Atelerix
 North African hedgehog, A. algirus 
Genus: Paraechinus
 Desert hedgehog, P. aethiopicus

Order: Soricomorpha (shrews, moles, and solenodons) 

The "shrew-forms" are insectivorous mammals. The shrews and solenodons closely resemble mice while the moles are stout bodied burrowers.
Family: Soricidae (shrews)
Subfamily: Crocidurinae
Genus: Crocidura
 Mauritanian shrew, C. lusitania 
 Greater white-toothed shrew, C. russula 
 Saharan shrew, C. tarfayensis 
 Lesser white-toothed shrew, C. suaveolens 
 Savanna path shrew, C. viaria 
 Whitaker's shrew, C. whitakeri 
Genus: Suncus
 Etruscan shrew, S. etruscus

Order: Chiroptera (bats) 

The bats' most distinguishing feature is that their forelimbs are developed as wings, making them the only mammals capable of flight. Bat species account for about 20% of all mammals.
Family: Vespertilionidae
Subfamily: Myotinae
Genus: Myotis
Long-fingered bat, M. capaccinii 
Geoffroy's bat, M. emarginatus 
Whiskered bat, M. mystacinus 
Zenati myotis, M. zenatius 
Felten's myotis, M. punicus 
Subfamily: Vespertilioninae
Genus: Barbastella
Western barbastelle, B. barbastellus 
Genus: Eptesicus
 Serotine bat, E. serotinus 
Genus: Hypsugo
Savi's pipistrelle, H. savii 
Genus: Nyctalus
Greater noctule bat, N. lasiopterus 
Lesser noctule, N. leisleri 
Genus: Otonycteris
Desert long-eared bat, O. hemprichii 
Genus: Pipistrellus
Egyptian pipistrelle, P. deserti 
Kuhl's pipistrelle, P. kuhlii 
Common pipistrelle, P. pipistrellus 
Rüppell's pipistrelle, P. rueppelli 
Genus: Plecotus
Mediterranean long-eared bat, P. kolombatovici 
Subfamily: Miniopterinae
Genus: Miniopterus
Common bent-wing bat, M. schreibersii 
Family: Rhinopomatidae
Genus: Rhinopoma
 Egyptian mouse-tailed bat, R. cystops 
Lesser mouse-tailed bat, R. hardwickei 
Greater mouse-tailed bat, R. microphyllum 
Family: Molossidae
Genus: Tadarida
Egyptian free-tailed bat, T. aegyptiaca 
European free-tailed bat, T. teniotis 
Family: Emballonuridae
Genus: Taphozous
Naked-rumped tomb bat, T. nudiventris 
Family: Nycteridae
Genus: Nycteris
Egyptian slit-faced bat, N. thebaica 
Family: Rhinolophidae
Subfamily: Rhinolophinae
Genus: Rhinolophus
Blasius's horseshoe bat, R. blasii 
Mediterranean horseshoe bat, R. euryale 
Greater horseshoe bat, R. ferrumequinum 
Mehely's horseshoe bat, R. mehelyi 
Subfamily: Hipposiderinae
Genus: Asellia
Trident leaf-nosed bat, A. tridens 
Genus: Hipposideros
Sundevall's roundleaf bat, H. caffer

Order: Cetacea (whales) 

The order Cetacea includes whales, dolphins and porpoises. They are the mammals most fully adapted to aquatic life with a spindle-shaped nearly hairless body, protected by a thick layer of blubber, and forelimbs and tail modified to provide propulsion underwater.
Suborder: Mysticeti
Family: Balaenidae (right whales)
Genus: Eubalaena
 North Atlantic right whale, E. glacialis 
Family: Balaenopteridae (rorquals)
Genus: Balaenoptera
 Northern minke whale, Balaenoptera acutorostrata 
 Sei whale, Balaenoptera borealis 
 Bryde's whale, Balaenoptera edeni 
 Blue whale, Balaenoptera musculus 
 Fin whale, Balaenoptera physalus 
Genus: Megaptera
 Humpback whale, Megaptera novaengliae 
Suborder: Odontoceti
Family: Delphinidae (pilot whales and dolphins)
Genus: Delphinus
 Short-beaked common dolphin, Delphinus delphis 
Genus: Globicephala
 Short-finned pilot whale, Globicephala macrorhynchus 
 Long-finned pilot whale, Globicephala melas 
Genus: Grampus
 Risso's dolphin, Grampus griseus 
Genus: Lagenodelphis
 Fraser's dolphin, Lagenodelphis hosei 
Genus: Orcinus
 Orca, Orcinus orca 
Genus: Pseudorca
 False killer whale, Pseudorca crassidens 
Genus: Feresa
 Pygmy killer whale, Feresa attenuata 
Genus: Stenella
 Striped dolphin, Stenella coeruleoalba 
 Atlantic spotted dolphin, Stenella frontalis 
Genus: Steno
 Rough-toothed dolphin, Steno bredanensis 
Genus: Tursiops
 Common bottlenose dolphin, Tursiops truncatus 
Family: Kogiidae (small sperm whales)
Genus: Kogia
 Pygmy sperm whale, Kogia breviceps 
 Dwarf sperm whale, Kogia sima 
Family: Phocoenidae (porpoises)
Genus: Phocoena
 Harbour porpoise, Phocoena phocoena 
Family: Physeteridae (sperm whales)
Genus: Physeter
 Sperm whale, Physeter macrocephalus 
Family: Ziphiidae (beaked whales)
Genus: Hyperoodon
 Northern bottlenose whale, Hyperoodon ampullatus 
Genus: Mesoplodon
 Sowerby's beaked whale, Mesoplodon bidens 
 Blainville's beaked whale, Mesoplodon densirostris 
 Gervais' beaked whale, Mesoplodon europaeus 
 True's beaked whale, Mesoplodon mirus 
Genus: Ziphius
 Cuvier's beaked whale, Ziphius cavirostris

Order: Carnivora (carnivorans) 

There are over 260 species of carnivorans, the majority of which feed primarily on meat. They have a characteristic skull shape and dentition. 
Suborder: Feliformia
Family: Felidae (cats)
Subfamily: Felinae
Genus: Caracal
Caracal, C. caracal 
Genus: Felis
African wildcat, F. lybica 
Sand cat, F. margarita  presence uncertain
Genus: Leptailurus
Serval, L. serval 
Family: Viverridae
Subfamily: Viverrinae
Genus: Genetta
Common genet, G. genetta 
Family: Herpestidae (mongooses)
Genus: Herpestes
Egyptian mongoose, H. ichneumon 
Family: Hyaenidae (hyaenas)
Genus: Hyaena
Striped hyena, H. hyaena 
Suborder: Caniformia
Family: Canidae (dogs, foxes)
Genus: Canis
African golden wolf, C. lupaster 
Genus: Vulpes
Rüppell's fox, V. rueppellii 
Red fox, V. vulpes 
Fennec fox, V. zerda 
Family: Mustelidae (mustelids)
Genus: Ictonyx
Saharan striped polecat, Ictonyx libyca 
Genus: Lutra
European otter, L. lutra 
Genus: Mellivora
Honey badger, M. capensis 
Genus: Mustela
Least weasel, M. nivalis 
European polecat, M. putorius 
Family: Phocidae (earless seals)
Genus: Monachus
Mediterranean monk seal, M. monachus  presence uncertain

Order: Artiodactyla (even-toed ungulates) 

The even-toed ungulates are ungulates whose weight is borne about equally by the third and fourth toes, rather than mostly or entirely by the third as in perissodactyls. There are about 220 artiodactyl species, including many that are of great economic importance to humans.
Family: Suidae (pigs)
Subfamily: Suinae
Genus: Sus
Wild boar, S. scrofa 
 North African boar, S. s. algira
Family: Cervidae (deer)
Subfamily: Cervinae
Genus: Cervus
Red deer, C. elaphus  
Barbary stag, C. e. barbarus
Family: Bovidae (cattle, antelope, sheep, goats)
Subfamily: Antilopinae
Genus: Gazella
Cuvier's gazelle, G. cuvieri 
 Dorcas gazelle, G. dorcas 
Genus: Nanger
 Dama gazelle, N. dama  possibly extirpated
Subfamily: Caprinae
Genus: Ammotragus
 Barbary sheep, A. lervia 
Subfamily: Hippotraginae
Genus: Oryx
 Scimitar oryx, O. dammah  vagrant

Locally extinct 
 Cheetah, Acinonyx jubatus
 Addax, Addax nasomaculatus
 Aurochs, Bos primigenius
 Hartebeest, Alcelaphus buselaphus
 North African elephant, Loxodonta africana pharaohensis
 Lion, Panthera leo
 Leopard, Panthera pardus
 Brown bear, Ursus arctos

See also
Lists of mammals by region
List of chordate orders
List of prehistoric mammals
Mammal classification
List of mammals described in the 2000s

References

 Aulagnier, S. et al. (2008) Guide des mammifères d'Europe, d'Afrique du Nord et de Moyen-Orient. Delachaux et Niestlé, Paris
 Kingdon, J. (1997) The Kingdon Field Guide to African Mammals. Helm, London
 Shirihai, H. & Jarrett, B. (2006) Whales, Dolphins and Seals: A Field Guide to the Marine Mammals of the World. A & C Black, London

External links

mammals
Morocco
Morocco